Frederick Louis of Württemberg-Winnental (5 November 1690, in Stuttgart – 19 September 1734, in Guastalla) was a German army commander of the eighteenth century.

He was the third son of Frederick Charles of Württemberg-Winnental and Margravine Eleonore Juliane of Brandenburg-Ansbach.

He learned the art of warfare in Dresden, Saxony. In 1708 he joined the Dutch Army and fought in the War of the Spanish Succession. In 1715 he returned to Saxony and fought against Sweden. In 1716 he fought under Prince Eugene of Savoy against the Turks and participated in the Siege of Belgrade (1717). In 1732 he led an army of 7,000 men for Genoa against the insurgents in Corsica.

War of the Polish Succession 

In the War of the Polish Succession, he commanded an army corps on the Italian front under Marshal Claudius Florimund Mercy. They suffered a defeat in the Battle of San Pietro and Mercy was killed.
Württemberg and Marshal Koenigsegg then struggled for command, disturbing the preparations and readiness of the Austrian troops.

This contributed to a second defeat in the Battle of Guastalla, where Württemberg was killed.

Marriage
On 22 October 1722 Frederick Louis married 42-year-old Ursula Katharina von Altenbockum, Princess of Teschen, divorced Princess Lubomirski and one of many ex-mistresses of August II the Strong.  Ursula was 10 years older than Frederick, and he married her for financial reasons. They had no children.

Ancestors

External links 

  Friedrich Ludwig, Prinz von Württemberg-Winnental

Military personnel from Stuttgart
People from the Duchy of Württemberg
German military personnel killed in action
German military personnel of the War of the Polish Succession
1690 births
1734 deaths
Generals of the Holy Roman Empire
Sons of monarchs